Dolores Dasalla Sibonga is Washington’s first Filipina American female lawyer.

She was born in 1931. Sibonga earned her journalism degree from the University of Washington in 1952. Her journalistic pursuits included co-owing the newspaper Filipino Forum with her husband. When her family entered financial straits, Sibonga returned to school to earn her Juris Doctor. By 1973, she became the first Filipina American admitted to practice law in Washington. Sibonga initially worked as a defense attorney before becoming a legislative analyst for the King County Council. In 1978, she achieved another historical first by becoming the first minority female to serve on the Seattle City Council. In 1989, Sibonga lost an election to become the Mayor of Seattle.

See also 

 List of first women lawyers and judges in Washington

References 

Washington (state) lawyers
American women lawyers
Seattle City Council members
University of Washington College of Arts and Sciences alumni
1931 births
Living people
Women city councillors in Washington (state)
Asian-American city council members
American politicians of Filipino descent
Asian-American people in Washington (state) politics
21st-century American women